Enele Malele (born 26 September 1990) is a Fijian professional rugby union player. He plays as a Fullback, Winger or Flyhalf for the Austin Herd in Major League Rugby, previously playing for Fijian Drua in the Australian National Rugby Championship and Fijian Latui in Global Rapid Rugby.

References

1990 births
Living people
Austin Gilgronis players
Expatriate rugby union players in the United States
Fijian expatriate rugby union players
Fijian expatriate sportspeople in the United States
Sportspeople from Suva
Fijian Drua players
Rugby union fly-halves